George Alberto Arias (born March 12, 1972) is a former baseball player in Major League Baseball and Nippon Professional Baseball.

Career
Arias was drafted by the California Angels in the seventh round of the 1993 Major League Baseball draft after graduating from the University of Arizona. He went back and forth between the majors and minor leagues after that, and was traded to the San Diego Padres during the  season. He played with the Padres until , before joining the Orix BlueWave in Japan.

He was a slow but solid fielder, and had a strong arm. Arias was a very streaky hitter, and had a very low batting average with runners in scoring position. He also won a Golden Glove award at first base, and the Best Nine award that year. He played in the Mexican League for the rest of the year.

Arias was signed by the Yomiuri Giants in June , and made his debut with the Giants in July as an outfielder. He was unable to repeat his previous success, and was demoted to the minors after playing 17 games. He hit only .167 his last year, and was cut at the end of 2006.

In 639 games in NPB, Arias hit .259 with 169 home runs and 436 RBI.

See also
1993 College Baseball All-America Team

External links

ESPN Article on Arias

1972 births
Living people
American expatriate baseball players in Canada
American expatriate baseball players in Japan
American expatriate baseball players in Mexico
Anaheim Angels players
Arizona Wildcats baseball players
Baseball players from Tucson, Arizona
California Angels players
Cedar Rapids Kernels players
Hanshin Tigers players
Lake Elsinore Storm players
Las Vegas Stars (baseball) players
Major League Baseball third basemen
Mexican League baseball first basemen
Mexican League baseball left fielders
Mexican League baseball third basemen
Midland Angels players
Nippon Professional Baseball first basemen
Nippon Professional Baseball third basemen
Orix BlueWave players
Pima Aztecs baseball players
Rancho Cucamonga Quakes players
San Diego Padres players
Vancouver Canadians players
Yomiuri Giants players